The Strecker amino acid synthesis, also known simply as the Strecker synthesis, is a method for the synthesis of amino acids by the reaction of an aldehyde with ammonia in the presence of potassium cyanide.  The condensation reaction yields an α-aminonitrile, which is subsequently hydrolyzed to give the desired amino acid. The method is used commercially for the production of racemic methionine from methional.

While usage of ammonium salts gives unsubstituted amino acids, primary and secondary amines also give substituted amino acids. Likewise, the usage of ketones, instead of aldehydes, gives α,α-disubstituted amino acids.

Reaction mechanism
In the first part of the reaction, the carbonyl oxygen of an aldehyde is protonated, followed by a nucleophilic attack of ammonia to the carbonyl carbon. After subsequent proton exchange, water is cleaved from the iminium ion intermediate. A cyanide ion then attacks the iminium carbon yielding an aminonitrile.

In the second part of the Strecker Synthesis the nitrile nitrogen of the aminonitrile is protonated, and the nitrile carbon is attacked by a water molecule. A 1,2-diamino-diol is then formed after proton exchange and a nucleophilic attack of water to the former nitrile carbon. Ammonia is subsequently eliminated after the protonation of the amino group, and finally the deprotonation of a hydroxyl group produces an amino acid.

One example of the Strecker synthesis is a multikilogram scale synthesis of an L-valine derivative starting from Methyl isopropyl ketone:

Asymmetric Strecker reactions
Asymmetric Strecker reactions are well developed. By replacing ammonia with (S)-alpha-phenylethylamine as chiral auxiliary the ultimate reaction product was chiral alanine. 

Catalytic asymmetric Strecker reaction can be effected using thiourea-derived catalysts. In 2012, a BINOL-derived catalyst was employed to generate chiral cyanide anion.

History
The German chemist Adolph Strecker discovered the series of chemical reactions that produce an amino acid from an aldehyde or ketone. Using ammonia or ammonium salts in this reaction gives unsubstituted amino acids.  In the original Strecker reaction acetaldehyde, ammonia, and hydrogen cyanide combined to form after hydrolysis alanine. Using primary and secondary amines in place of ammonium was shown to yield N-substituted amino acids. 

The classical Strecker synthesis gives racemic mixtures of α-amino acids as products, but several alternative procedures using asymmetric auxiliaries or asymmetric catalysts have been developed.

The asymmetric Strecker reaction was reported by Harada in 1963.  The first asymmetric synthesis via a chiral catalyst was reported in 1996.

Commercial syntheses of amino acids
Several methods exist to synthesize amino acids aside from the Strecker synthesis. 

The commercial production of amino acids usually relies on mutant bacteria that overproduce individual amino acids using glucose as a carbon source.  Otherwise amino acids are produced by enzymatic conversions of synthetic intermediates. 2-Aminothiazoline-4-carboxylic acid is an intermediate in one industrial synthesis of L-cysteine.  Aspartic acid is produced by the addition of ammonia to fumarate using a lyase.

One of the oldest methods begins with the bromination at the α-carbon of a carboxylic acid. Nucleophilic substitution with ammonia then converts the alkyl bromide to the amino acid.

References

See also
 Bucherer–Bergs reaction

Multiple component reactions
Substitution reactions
Name reactions
Chemical synthesis of amino acids